The Amarillo Sod Poodles, nicknamed the Soddies, are a Minor League Baseball team of the Texas League and the Double-A affiliate of the Arizona Diamondbacks. They are located in Amarillo, Texas, and play their home games at Hodgetown in downtown Amarillo.

History
On June 21, 2017, David G. Elmore, president of Elmore Sports Group, announced the relocation of the San Antonio Missions Double-A franchise to Amarillo in 2019, with the team set to compete in the Texas League under a new nickname. This move was part of a larger relocation wherein the Triple-A Colorado Springs Sky Sox of the Pacific Coast League relocated to San Antonio in 2019, continuing the use of the Missions nickname at the Triple-A level, and the Helena Brewers of the rookie level Pioneer League moved to Colorado Springs.

The organization officially states that team's name was decided in a name-the-team contest. Five finalists were selected: "Boot Scooters," "Bronc Busters," "Jerky," "Long Haulers," and "Sod Poodles." The names received negative feedback from locals over their absurd nature, but the team indicated their intention to adopt an unusual, family-friendly name. Brandiose, a branding firm in San Diego, were asked to create a new identity for the team. Their staff selected the Sod Poodles name after visiting Amarillo and researching its history. The name is in reference to the prevalence of prairie dogs in West Texas. The name was meant to convey the values of sticking together, being family oriented, and self sufficient.

Amarillo's home ballpark was named Hodgetown in honor of Amarillo pharmacist, businessman, philanthropist, and 26th Mayor of Amarillo Jerry Hodge.

As the Double-A affiliate of the San Diego Padres, the Sod Poodles played their first game, a 5–2 loss, on April 4, 2019, against the Corpus Christi Hooks at Whataburger Field in Corpus Christi. Their first win came the next evening when they defeated the Hooks, 7–5. The winning run was scored in the top of the seventh inning when Matthew Batten tripled and later scored on a Buddy Reed single. In their inaugural home opener on April 8, the Sod Poodles lost to the Midland RockHounds, 9–4 in 10 innings. The opener was attended by 7,175 people.

In the 2019 Texas League South Series, the Sod Poodles fell behind 2 games to none against the Midland RockHounds, before winning 3 straight games in Midland to advance to the Championship Series against the Tulsa Drillers, who defeated the Arkansas Travelers 3 games to 2.

In the 2019 Championship Series, Amarillo won game 1 by a score of 13-6 at Hodgetown, while falling 18-9 in game 2. As the series shifted to Tulsa, the Drillers took a 2 games to 1 in game 3 with a 2-0 win. The Sod Poodles battled back with a game 4 victory by a score of 3-0. In game 5, the Sod Poodles were down 3-1 in the top of the ninth before Taylor Trammell hit a grand slam to take a lead that the Sod Poodles would never relinquish, en route to a Texas League championship in their inaugural season.

On December 9, 2020, the Arizona Diamondbacks extended an invitation to the Sod Poodles to become their Double-A affiliate as a part of Major League Baseball's 2021 reorganization of the minor leagues. In a further change, they were organized into the Double-A Central. In 2022, the Double-A Central became known as the Texas League, the name historically used by the regional circuit prior to the 2021 reorganization.

In 2022, Veronica Gajownik coached for the Sod Poodles.

Season-by-season records

Texas League

Roster

Minor league affiliations

References

External links
Official website

2019 establishments in Texas
Texas League teams
Professional baseball teams in Texas
Sports in Amarillo, Texas
Baseball teams established in 2019
Arizona Diamondbacks minor league affiliates
San Diego Padres minor league affiliates
Double-A Central teams